Kokugakuin University (國學院大學; Kokugakuin Daigaku, abbreviated as 國學大 Kokugakudai or 國大 Kokudai) is a private university, whose main office is in Tokyo's Shibuya district. The academic programs and research include Shinto study, Japanese history, Japanese and Chinese literature and Community development, as well as the study of economics, jurisprudence and pedagogy . It was established in 1882.

History

From its beginnings as the Office of Japanese Classics Research (an organization created in 1882 to seek deeper meaning in Shinto after controversies over certain deities), Kokugakuin University was one of the first universities in Japan to gain legal approval to be recognized as such under the university system (which preceded the Imperial university system, but was repealed in 1947).

The Office of Japanese Classics Research, founded in 1882, in 1890 established a method of teaching the subject of kokugaku called Kokugakuin.  In 1920, it rose to the status of a university under the old university system, and after World War II it became a university under Japan's current university system in 1948.

Chronology
 1882, November - The Office of Japanese Classics Research is founded in Iidabashi, Chiyoda ward.
 1890, July - Kokugakuin is established as an educational institution by The Office of Japanese Classics Research.
 1898, April - Becomes a juridical foundation.
 1904, April - Raised to the status of a vocational school according to the vocational school system.
 1906, June - Renamed to Private Kokugakuin University (私立國學院大學, Shiritsu Kokugakuin Daigaku).
 1919, September - Renamed to Kokugakuin University (国学院大学, Kokugakuin Daigaku).
 1920, April - Is regarded as an official university under the university system.
 1923, May -  Moves to the Imperial Estate behind Shibuya Higawa (渋谷氷川裏御料地, Shibuya Higawaura Goryōchi).
 1946, January - The Office of Japanese Classics Research dissolves.
 1946, March - Once again is foundationalized and the Kokugakuin University Juridical Foundation is established.
 1947, April - A second department opens.
 1948, April - Under the reformed educational system, recognized as a university, department of new system literature opens.
 1948, September - Amalgamates with Mejiro Academy (目白学園, Mejiro Gakuen).
 1949, April - A second department of new system literature is opened.  Classes begin at the Mejiro branch. The Politics Department is established.
 1950, April - The Politics Department is reorganized into the Politics and Economics Department.
 1951, February - Reforms to Kokugakuin University Incorporated.
 1951, March - The first and specialty old system literature departments are closed.
 1951, April - The second Politics and Economics Department opens. A post-graduate master's degree program in literature is established.
 1951, May - A special course in Shinto training literature is established.
 1952, September - Amalgamates with Kugayama Academy (久我山学園 Kugayama Gakuen).
 1953, March - The second old system literature department is closed. Classes at the Mejiro branch are halted.
 1953, April - A post-graduate Ph.D. program in literature is established. Classes begin at the Kugayama branch.
 1955, January - A training program to become a kindergarten teacher is opened.
 1955, July - A Japanese culture research program is established.
 1958, March - Classes at the Kugayama branch are halted.
 1958, April - The Shinto major program changes to the Shinto studies program.
 1958, July - Tateshina Dormitory (蓼科寮, Tateshina Ryō) opens.
 1963, April - The first Law Department is established.
 1965, April - The second Law Department is established.
 1966, March - The first and second Politics and Economics departments close.
 1966, April - The Politics and Economics Department is reorganized, the first and second Economics departments are created.
 1967, April - A post-graduate master's degree program in law is established.  The second Shinto literature department is opened. Classes commence at the Hachioji (八王子, Hachiōji) branch building.
 1968, April - A post-graduate master's degree program in economics is established.
 1969, April - A post-graduate Ph.D. program in law is established.
 1970, April - A post-graduate Ph.D. program in economics is established.
 1982, April - Kokugakuin Women's Junior College is opened.
 1985, March - Classes at the Hachioji branch building are terminated.
 1985, April - Classes begin at the Shin-Ishikawa (新石川, Shin-Ishikawa) building.
 1985, November - A monument to the Office of Japanese Classics Research is erected.
 1987, April - Completed construction of the Shin-In'yū (新院友, Shin-In'yū) meeting hall.
 1991, April - Kokugakuin Women's Junior College is renamed to Kokugakuin Junior College and is opened to both sexes.
 1991, September - Hachioji branch building is shut down.
 1992, April - First and second year classes begin to be held at the Tama Plaza campus.
 1996, April - Part of the literature department is reorganized into Japanese literature, Chinese literature, and foreign literature sections.  In the Economics department, Economic Networking and Industrial Consumption Information sections are created.  The Sagamihara (相模原, Sagamihara) campus is opened.
 2001, April - The system of daytime and evening lectures is introduced for the law and economics departments.
 2002, April - The literature and Shinto departments are reorganized, and the Shinto Literature department is opened.
 2002, November - The 120th anniversary since the founding of the Office of Japanese Classics Research is recognized.
 2003, April - In commemoration of the 120th anniversary, building #1 is constructed.
 2004, April - A Judicial Studies graduate program (i.e., law school) is established.
 2004, July - In commemoration of the 120th anniversary, building #2 is constructed.
 2005, April - A Management Studies section is created in the Economics department.  The system of daytime and evening lectures is introduced for the Japanese literature and history sections of the literature department.
 2006, June - Construction of the Wakagi (若木, Wakagi) Tower is completed.
 2022, April - Tourism and Community Development department are created.

Education and research
At Kokugakuin, one can take a course to obtain the qualifications to become a kannushi (Shinto priest). A course where one can get these qualifications exists only at Kokugakuin University and Kogakkan University.

Departments
Literature
Japanese Literature
Chinese Literature
Foreign Literature
History
Philosophy
Economics
Economics
Management
Law
Shinto Studies
Shinto Studies
Daytime lectures
Evening lectures
Human Development
Elementary Education
Health and Physical Education
Child Studies
Tourism and Community Development

Graduate programs
Literature
Shinto specialization and history of religions
Japanese literature specialization
Japanese history specialization
Law
Economics

Professional graduate program
Judicial Studies (law school)

Special programs
Shinto Studies Graduate Program

Special courses
Specialized Training in Shinto Studies

Junior college (two-year programs)
Japanese literature
Communications
Child Education

Affiliated facilities
Japanese Literature Research Institute
Dr. Orikuchi Memorial Ancient Research Institute
Shinto Reference Facility
Archaeology Reference Facility
Dr. Kōno (河野, Kōno) Memorial Room
Dr. Takeda (武田, Takeda) Memorial Room

People and organizations related to Kokugakuin

People and organizations
Alumni, professors, and others related to the school are known as In'yū (院友, In'yū).  There is a graduate's association called the In'yū Association, and a meeting hall called the In'yū Hall at the Shibuya campus. Most Shinto priests at shrines across Japan are In'yū.

List of people associated with Kokugakuin

Masumi Asano (born 1977), Japanese seiyu
Eiko Kano (born 1982), Japanese comedian and musician
Manamo Miyata (born 1998), Japanese singer
Momoko Tsugunaga (born 1992), Japanese singer

Facilities

Campuses
There are also facilities in Sagamihara and other areas.

Shibuya campus, Higashi, Tokyo

Higashi 4-10-28, Shibuya-ku, Tōkyō-to (東京都渋谷区東四丁目10番28号)

Closest station is Shibuya station on the Yamanote line.
The Kokugakuin University Museum is on the Shibuya campus. This museum houses an extensive collection of historical and archeological artifacts as well as special exhibits.

Tama Plaza campus

Shin-Ishikawa 3-22-1, Aoba-ku, Yokohama-shi, Kanagawa-ken (神奈川県横浜市青葉区新石川三丁目22番地1)
Closest station is Tama-Plaza Station on the Tōkyū Den-en-toshi Line.
Has a baseball diamond, sports ground, and tennis courts.
Sagamihara City has tennis courts and other facilities, but while some clubs and circles make use of the facilities, most students do not use the Sagamihara campus.

Agreements with other universities
Participant in the Western Tokyo University Credit Interchange Agreement
Participant in the Yokohama City Educational Exchange Conference
Participant in the Yamanote Line Consortium

Sister Schools
Nihon University: This agreement came about when Nihon University's predecessor organization, Nihon Law School, was founded during one night at the Office of Japanese Classics Research. After that, when Kokugakuin's president would change, or when Nihon University's president or board chairman would change, they would go to the partner school to give their greetings. Finally, both parties agreed to begin a sister relationship.

Related schools
The educational institutions in Tochigi Prefecture listed below operate independently of Kokugakuin University, and exist under a separate incorporated legal entity.
Kokugakuin University Inc., Tochigi Campus
Kokugakuin University Tochigi Junior College
Kokugakuin University Tochigi Senior High School
Kokugakuin University Tochigi Junior High School
Kokugakuin University Tochigi Nisugi (二杉, Nisugi) Kindergarten

Affiliated schools
Kokugakuin Junior College
Kokugakuin Senior High School
Kokugakuin University Kugayama Junior and Senior High School
Kokugakuin University Kindergarten
Kokugakuin Kindergarten
Kokugakuin University Child Education Vocational School

References

Official website

 Kokugakuin University
 Kokugakuin University 

 
Universities and colleges in Tokyo
Private universities and colleges in Japan
Educational institutions established in 1920
Universities and colleges in Kanagawa Prefecture
Western Metropolitan Area University Association
Shinto universities and colleges
1920 establishments in Japan